ECIL may refer to:
 Electronics Corporation of India Limited
 Emergency Committee for Israel's Leadership